Callian may refer to:

France
 Callian, Gers
 Callian, Var

India
 Kalyan, Maharashtra, formerly Callian